Ashfield is an unincorporated community in East Penn Township, Carbon County located south of Lehighton and west of Bowmanstown on Route 895 at the northern foot of Blue Mountain. The Lizard Creek flows east through Ashfield into the Lehigh River. Although the village has its own post office with the zip code of 18212, some residents are served by the Lehighton post office, Zip Code 18235. 

Unincorporated communities in Carbon County, Pennsylvania
Unincorporated communities in Pennsylvania